The Rikugun Ki-93 was a prototype Japanese twin-engined fighter aircraft of the Second World War. Designed by the Army Aerotechnical Research Institute, to be a heavy fighter armed with large calibre cannon to serve in the anti-shipping or bomber destroyer roles, only one example of the Ki-93 was completed; this was damaged on its maiden flight, and destroyed by American bombing before it could be flown again.

Development and design
In mid 1941, a team was set up at the Japanese Army Aerotechnical Research Institute (or Rikugun Kokugijutsu Kenkyujo, known by the abbreviation Giken) to study advanced military aircraft. The team drew up preliminary designs for a twin-engined heavy fighter for the Imperial Japanese Army Air Service, to be powered by two Mitsubishi Ha-211 radial engines and estimated to reach a speed of 680 km/h (422 mph). In July 1942, the design, along with some of the team from Giken, was passed to the First Army Air Arsenal (Dai-Ichi Rikugun Kokusho or Kosho) at Tachikawa for further development. Here, the design was refined, with more powerful Mitsubishi Ha-214 radials substituted and a heavy cannon armament added.

Approval to build prototypes of the new fighter, designated Ki-93, was given on 22 February 1943. The Ki-93 was a low-winged monoplane of all metal construction, with the crew of two sitting in tandem under a canopy at the front of the fuselage, and a ventral gondola slung under the fuselage to accommodate large cannons. The wing was of laminar flow section. Two variants were planned, the Ki-93-Ia bomber destroyer, armed with a 57 mm and two 20 mm cannon, and the Ki-93-Ib anti-shipping aircraft, which would have a 75 mm gun in the gondola and would also carry two 250 kg (550 lb) bombs.

The first prototype proved to be overweight, while the new engines gave much less power than expected, delivering only 1,970 hp compared with the expected 2,400 hp. The Ki-93 made its first flight on 8 April 1945 from Tachikawa airfield; a successful 20 minute test of its low-speed handling characteristics, piloted by Lt. Moriya of the Koku Shinsa-bu (Air Examination Department) with 2nd Lt. Ikebayashi in the second seat. Unfortunately, the pilot undershot the runway and touched down in soft soil, ground-looping the aircraft and tearing off the port undercarriage leg and engine mount, also bending the six-blade propeller. Repairs were completed in four weeks but, the night before the scheduled second test flight, a B-29 bombing raid on Tachikawa destroyed the hangar housing the aircraft.

Specifications (performance estimated, Ki-93-Ia armament)

See also

Notes

References

 Francillon, René J. Japanese Aircraft of the Pacific War. London: Putnam & Company, 1970. .
"The Giken Fighter". Air International, May 1977, Vol 12 No. 5. pp. 251–255.

External links
www.warbirdsresourcegroup.org

1940s Japanese fighter aircraft
Low-wing aircraft
Aircraft first flown in 1945
Twin piston-engined tractor aircraft